Dublin West by-election may refer to:

 1996 Dublin West by-election
 2011 Dublin West by-election
 2014 Dublin West by-election